CyberDissidents.org is a division of Advancing Human Rights, a 501 (c) (3) non-profit organization. CyberDissidents.org focuses on the human rights of online political activists. The group believes that highlighting the plight of individual democratic dissidents in the West affords a measure of protection against government oppression.

Profile 

Founded in 2008, CyberDissidents.org originally focused on autocratic Middle Eastern countries.  The organization's co-founder and director, David Keyes, served previously as coordinator for democracy programs under Soviet dissident Natan Sharansky.  Keyes has written for The Washington Post, The Wall Street Journal, The New Republic, The Daily Beast, National Review, The Jerusalem Post and other publications.

Relying on a broad network of bloggers in the region, CyberDissidents.org monitors, analyses and publicizes dissidents' activities in the West.  Its staff meet frequently with policy-makers in the United States, the Middle East and Europe.  CyberDissidents.org promotes linkage between foreign aid and human rights.

The organization aims to utilize the findings of psychology professor Paul Slovic who studied the phenomenon of indifference in the face of humanitarian disasters.  Professor Slovic has written that highlighting individuals is the most effective way of provoking sympathy and concern for a cause.  This is seen in the organization's "Featured CyberDissident" which focuses on a particular dissident's story.

Now incorporated into Advancing Human Rights, CyberDissidents serves as a database of dissident writing and can be found at the AHR website.

Board of advisors 

Ahmed Batebi, Chairman and Iranian cyber-dissident who was imprisoned in Iran for eight years for student activities
Dr Saad Eddin Ibrahim, Egypt's most famous democratic dissident and founder of the Ibn Khaldun Center for Development Studies and the Arab Organization for Human Rights
Irwin Cotler, Canada's former Minister of Justice and Attorney General
Natan Sharansky, renowned Soviet dissident (On Leave)
Peter Deutsch, former Democratic US Congressman
Dorian Barak, former war crimes prosecutor at the International Criminal Tribunal for the Former Yugoslavia in the Hague (ICTY)
Nazanin Afshin-Jam, president and co-founder of Stop Child Executions and prime ministerially-appointed member of board of directors of the Canadian Race Relations Foundation
Abdul Wahid al-Nur, founder of the Sudan Liberation Movement
Jim Prince, founder and president of the Democracy Council
Samer Libdeh, director of the Interaction Forum, a Jordanian democracy-promotion group
Dr Nima Mina, lecturer in Persian at the School of Oriental and African Studies at the University of London

Bernard Lewis, Professor Emeritus of Near Eastern Studies at Princeton University, served on CyberDissidents.org's board of advisers for the first two years of its existence.

In 2011, Keyes partnered with founding chairman emeritus of Human Rights Watch, Bob Bernstein, to form Advancing Human Rights.

Syrian dissident Ahed Al Hendi is the coordinator for Arabic programs at CyberDissidents.org.  Al Hendi fled Syria and is currently a refugee living in the United States. Imprisoned and tortured by the Syrian government, Al Hendi has worked with the  Samir Kassir Foundation in Lebanon as its Syrian researcher and writes frequently in favor of democracy in the Middle East. He has been cited in The Wall Street Journal, The New York Times and writes for several Arabic papers including Al Mustaqbal. In 2010, he was a featured speaker at the Bush Foundation Conference on CyberDissidents where he met with President Bush.

Activities 

On June 11, 2010, Keyes hosted a panel in the United States Congress. The briefing was held in the Committee on Foreign Affairs and addressed the issue of technology, Internet and access to independent media in Iran. Former Iranian deputy Prime Minister in Political Affairs, Mohsen Sazegara, and former senior director for Middle East Affairs in the National Security Council, Michael Singh joined the briefing.  The panel was broadcast live on C-SPAN .

CyberDissidents.org sparked international controversy following an op-ed authored by the organisation's director on February 16, 2010, in The Wall Street Journal criticizing Turkey's ban on YouTube, which launched a protest movement in Turkey.  According to PBS, Keyes' piece which was written from Istanbul, caused the Turkish newspaper Milliyet, together with other leading Turkish papers, to initiate a protest campaign to draw attention to the ban on YouTube. Shortly after the publication of Keyes' article, Turkish president Abdullah Gul came out against the ban.

The organization has been featured in a wide array of press, including The Boston Globe, The Wall Street Journal,  Voice of America and Alhurra television.

In 2008 and 2009, CyberDissidents.org coordinated global protests at Egyptian embassies and university campuses in the United States, Canada and Israel in support of Egyptian blogger Abdul Kareem Nabil Suleiman (also known as Kareem Amer), who was jailed in 2007 for criticizing Egyptian President Hosni Mubarak and "insulting Islam." CyberDissidents.org board member and former Soviet dissident Natan Sharansky supported the protests, stating that "freedom of speech is an inalienable right. Suppressing that right contravenes human decency and makes a mockery of the democratic ideal."

References 

Civil rights organizations in the United States
International human rights organizations
Non-profit organizations based in New York City